Anthony Martin Branch (July 16, 1823 – October 3, 1867)  was a Texas politician who served in the Confederate States Congress during the American Civil War.

Biography
Branch was born in Buckingham County, Virginia. He graduated from Hampden–Sydney College in 1842, and moved to Huntsville, Texas in 1847. He married Amanda Smith in 1849.

He was a member of the Texas House of Representatives in 1859 and the Texas Senate in 1861.

During much of the Civil War, Branch served in the Confederate States Army as a captain in Company A, the 21st Texas Cavalry (also known as the 1st Texas Lancers). He later represented Texas in the Second Confederate Congress in 1864 and 1865 until the end of the war.

Anthony Martin Branch died in Huntsville on October 3, 1867.

Notes

External links
 The Political Graveyard

1823 births
1867 deaths
19th-century American politicians
Confederate States Army officers
Hampden–Sydney College alumni
Members of the Confederate House of Representatives from Texas
Members of the Texas House of Representatives
People from Buckingham County, Virginia
Texas state senators